Paulette Goddard (born Marion Levy; June 3, 1910 – April 23, 1990) was an American actress notable for her film career in the Golden Age of Hollywood.

Born in Manhattan and raised in Kansas City, Missouri, Goddard initially began her career as a child fashion model and performer in several Broadway productions as a Ziegfeld Girl. In the early 1930s, she moved to Hollywood and gained notice as the romantic partner of actor and comedian Charlie Chaplin, appearing as his leading lady in Modern Times (1936) and The Great Dictator (1940). After signing with Paramount Pictures, Goddard became one of the studio's biggest stars with roles in The Cat and the Canary (1939) with Bob Hope, The Women (1939) with Joan Crawford, North West Mounted Police (1940) with Gary Cooper, Reap the Wild Wind (1942) with John Wayne and Susan Hayward, So Proudly We Hail! (1943) (for which she received a nomination for Academy Award for Best Supporting Actress), Kitty (1945) with Ray Milland, and Unconquered (1947) with Gary Cooper.

Goddard was noted as a fiercely independent woman for her time, being described by one executive as "dynamite". Her marriages to Chaplin, actor Burgess Meredith, and writer Erich Maria Remarque received substantial media attention. Following her marriage to Remarque, Goddard moved to Switzerland and largely retired from acting. In the 1980s, she became a notable socialite before dying in Switzerland in 1990.

Early life
Goddard was born in New York City, as Marion Levy, the daughter of Joseph Russell Levy, the son of a prosperous cigar manufacturer from Salt Lake City, and Alta Mae Goddard. Her father was of Russian Jewish heritage, while her mother an Episcopalian of English ancestry. They had married on December 28, 1908, in Manhattan. Although named Marion, her mother had called her Pauline from a young age. Goddard moved with her parents to Kansas City, Missouri when she was young, where her father worked for a film company. Shortly thereafter, her parents separated and divorced in 1926. According to Goddard, her father left them, but according to J. R. Levy, Alta absconded with the child; to avoid a custody battle, she and her mother moved often during her childhood, including relocating to Canada at one point. Goddard did not meet her father again until the late 1930s, after she had become famous. In a 1938 interview published in Collier's, Goddard claimed Levy was not her biological father. In response, Levy filed a suit against his daughter, claiming that the interview had ruined his reputation and cost him his job, and demanded financial support from her; Goddard admitted her loss in the case in a December 1945 interview with Life, and was forced to pay her father $35 a week.

Goddard began modeling after her parents' separation, working for Saks Fifth Avenue, Hattie Carnegie, and others. An important figure in her childhood was her mother's paternal uncle Charles Goddard, the owner of the American Druggists Syndicate. He played a central role in Goddard's career, introducing her to Broadway impresario Florenz Ziegfeld. In 1926, she made her stage debut as a dancer in Ziegfeld's summer revue, No Foolin''' under the stage name Paulette Goddard. Ziegfeld hired her for another musical, Rio Rita, which opened in February 1927, but she left the show after only three weeks to appear in the play The Unconquerable Male, produced by Archie Selwyn. However, it was a flop and closed after only three days following its premiere in Atlantic City. Soon after, Goddard was introduced to Edgar James, president of the Southern Lumber Company, located in Asheville, North Carolina, by Charles Goddard. Aged 17, considerably younger than James, she married him on June 28, 1927, in Rye, New York. It was a short marriage, and they separated in 1929; Goddard was granted a divorce in Reno, Nevada, in 1932, receiving a divorce settlement of $375,000.

Film career
Goddard first visited Hollywood in 1929, when she appeared as an uncredited extra in two films, the Laurel and Hardy short film Berth Marks (1929) and George Fitzmaurice's drama The Locked Door (1929). Following her divorce from James, Goddard and her mother briefly visited Europe before returning to Hollywood. Upon her return, Goddard signed her first film contract with producer Samuel Goldwyn to appear as a Goldwyn Girl in Whoopee! (1930). She also appeared in City Streets (1931), Ladies of the Big House (1931), and The Girl Habit (1931) for Paramount, Palmy Days (1931) for Goldwyn, and The Mouthpiece (1932) for Warners. However, Goddard and Goldwyn did not get along, and she also began work for Hal Roach Studios in 1932, appearing in a string of uncredited supporting roles for the next four years.

1932–38: Charlie Chaplin and David Selznick

The year she signed with Hal Roach, Goddard began dating Charlie Chaplin, a relationship that received substantial attention from the press. It marked a turning point in Goddard's career when Chaplin cast her as his leading lady in his next box office hit, Modern Times (1936). Her role as "The Gamin", an orphan girl who runs away from the authorities and becomes The Tramp's companion, was her first credited film appearance and garnered her mainly positive reviews, Frank S. Nugent of The New York Times describing her as "the fitting recipient of the great Charlot's championship".

Following the success of Modern Times, Chaplin planned other projects with Goddard in mind as a co-star, but he worked slowly, and Goddard worried that the public might forget about her if she did not continue to make regular film appearances. She signed a contract with David O. Selznick and appeared with Janet Gaynor in the comedy The Young in Heart (1938). Selznick, who was pleased with Goddard's performance in the film, strongly considered her for the role of Scarlett O'Hara in Gone With the Wind. Initial screen tests convinced Selznick and director George Cukor that Goddard would require coaching to be effective in the role, but that she showed promise. By December 1938, Selznick had narrowed the choices to Goddard and Vivien Leigh, who won the role after the two completed the only Technicolor screen tests for the role. Goddard's losing out on the role was attributable to several factors. Notably, the head of Selznick's publicity department Russell Birdwell had strong misgivings about Goddard, writing "Briefly, I think she is dynamite that will explode in our very faces if she is given the part." Chaplin's biographer Joyce Milton wrote that Selznick also worried about legal issues by signing Goddard to a contract that might conflict with her pre-existing contracts with the Chaplin studio.

During this time, Selznick lent Goddard to MGM for two films: Dramatic School (1938) and the all-female ensemble The Women (1939). The first, with Luise Rainer, received mediocre reviews and failed to attract an audience. However, The Women – directed by Cukor following his firing from Gone with the Wind – was one of the year's most successful films. Of her role Miriam Aarons, film critic Pauline Kael later wrote of Goddard, "she is a stand-out. Fun."

1939–49: Paramount

In 1939, Goddard signed a contract with Paramount Pictures and was promptly teamed with comedian Bob Hope for the horror comedy film The Cat and the Canary (1939). The film became a turning point for both their careers, and they were promptly reteamed for The Ghost Breakers (1940) and Nothing but the Truth (1941), both of which also featured Willie Best. She was also cast for the musical comedy Second Chorus opposite Fred Astaire, Artie Shaw, and future husband Burgess Meredith. Astaire later described it as "the worst film I ever made" while Shaw admitted the film made him reconsider an acting career. In September 1939, Chaplin also began production on his next film The Great Dictator (1940) in which Goddard again co-starred alongside him as Hannah. The film was released the following year to critical and audience acclaim. However, it would also be her final film with Chaplin, as their marriage fell apart soon after.

In 1940, Goddard made the Cecil B. DeMille Western film North West Mounted Police opposite Gary Cooper and Madeleine Carroll. The film, her first dramatic role for Paramount, became one of the year's top-ten grossing films. She also starred in another musical comedy Pot o' Gold opposite James Stewart, which was released the following year. Stewart expressed similar feelings toward his film as Astaire, while Goddard's biographer Julie Gilbert claimed Goddard did not like Stewart's acting, reportedly saying "anyone can gulp". Her other film for 1941, romantic drama Hold Back the Dawn with Charles Boyer and Olivia de Havilland, received positive reviews.

In 1942, Goddard gave one of her better-remembered film appearances in the variety musical Star Spangled Rhythm, in which she sang "A Sweater, a Sarong, and a Peekaboo Bang" with Dorothy Lamour and Veronica Lake. The studio also began to pair her with Ray Milland. Her first pairing with Milland, The Lady Has Plans, was panned by critics and had a tepid box office performance. However, she quickly reunited with him and DeMille for the adventure film Reap the Wild Wind. The film, which also co-starred John Wayne and Susan Hayward, saw Goddard in a Scarlett O'Hara-type role and became the studio's best-grossing film for the year. Their third film, The Crystal Ball, was bought by United Artists – a studio co-founded by Chaplin – and released the following year to tepid box office receipts. That same year, Goddard headlined So Proudly We Hail! with Claudette Colbert and Veronica Lake. Her performance as Lt. Joan O'Doul, a nurse serving in the Battle of the Philippines, earned Goddard a nomination for an Academy Award for Best Supporting Actress at the 16th Academy Awards. She reteamed with her co-star in that film, Sonny Tufts, in I Love a Soldier the following year with less successful results.

In May 1944, Goddard renegotiated her contract with Paramount to make two films per year over a seven-year period. The first film under this deal, costume drama Kitty, reunited her with Milland. The film required Goddard to learn a cockney accent, for which she was coached by Connie Lupino, mother of actress Ida Lupino. The film was released the following year, becoming her most successful film for the studio. The following year, she starred in The Diary of a Chambermaid opposite her husband Burgess Meredith; the couple also produced the film for United Artists.

In 1947, she starred in two box office disasters: the historical epic Unconquered, which reunited her with Cooper and DeMille; and comedy An Ideal Husband, which she made in Britain for Alexander Korda. Although one of the year's highest-grossing films, Unconquered had a large budget – further inflated by going past its shooting schedule – that caused it to lose money for Paramount. The film's story was also criticized, though Goddard and Cooper received positive reviews for their performances. During production of the film, Goddard and DeMille clashed on the set over Goddard's reluctance to do a dangerous stunt. An Ideal Husband suffered from behind-the-scenes difficulties that included a crew strike over Goddard using her personal, Swedish-born hairdresser over an English one. Besides for Britain, the film severely underperformed at the box office, being pulled in the United States with several other British films due to a boycott by the radical Zionist group Sons of Liberty over British policies in the Palestine Mandate. The following year, Goddard reunited with Meredith in a segment of the comedy film On Our Merry Way, which he also produced. However, that same year, Meredith was placed on the Hollywood blacklist after an investigation by the House Un-American Activities Committee (Chaplin would also later be added to the blacklist). Goddard was paired with MacDonald Carey in two films for Paramount, Hazard (1948) and Bride of Vengeance (1949); and was loaned to Columbia Pictures for the film noir Anna Lucasta. However, all three of the films lost money, and she left the studio in 1949.

1950–58: Freelance and television

After leaving Paramount and divorcing Meredith, Goddard headlined the Mexican-American film The Torch (1950), also serving as an associate producer. The following year, she made her television debut in an episode of Four Star Revue. Her roles in films such as film noir Vice Squad opposite Edward G. Robinson, and the biblical character Jezebel in Sins of Jezebel failed to attract the attention of her earlier work. Her last starring film role was in the film noir A Stranger Came Home in 1954, which The New York Times deemed "A third-rate British-made whodunit," and said "A few more fly-by-nights like this Lippert presentation... and the still-shapely Miss Goddard may find herself collecting the pieces of a career"; That same year, Goddard guest starred as Lady Beryl on the second episode of Sherlock Holmes starring Ronald Howard (son of Leslie Howard) as Holmes. She continued appearing in summer stock and on television, guest starring on episodes of Adventures in Paradise, The Errol Flynn Theatre, The Joseph Cotten Show, and The Ford Television Theatre.

Later life

In 1958, Goddard remarried for the final time to writer Erich Maria Remarque, who was twelve years her senior. Wealthy from shrewd investments, she largely retired from acting and moved with him to Ronco sopra Ascona, Switzerland. However, she did continue to act occasionally, appearing in the unsold television pilot The Phantom, a supporting role in the Italian film Time of Indifference (1964), and a small role in the pilot of The Snoop Sisters. Remarque died on September 25, 1970, from heart failure in Locarno.

In addition to her own wealth, Goddard inherited much of Remarque's money and several important properties across Europe, including a wealth of contemporary art, which augmented her own long-standing collection. During this period, her talent at accumulating wealth became a byword among the old Hollywood elite. She also became a fairly well known and highly visible socialite in New York City, appearing covered with jewels at many high-profile cultural functions with several well-known men, including Andy Warhol, with whom she sustained a friendship for many years until his death in 1987. Goddard underwent invasive treatment for breast cancer in 1975, which by all accounts was successful.

Personal life

Goddard married the much older lumber tycoon Edgar James on June 28, 1927, when she was 17 years old; the couple moved to North Carolina. They separated two years later and divorced in January 1932.

In 1932, Goddard began a relationship with Charlie Chaplin and moved into his home in Beverly Hills. Aside from referring to Goddard as "my wife" at the October 1940 premiere of The Great Dictator, neither Goddard nor Chaplin publicly commented on their marital status. On June 3, 1942, Goddard filed for divorce in Mexico that was granted the following day. Although Goddard claimed in her filing that they had been married in Canton, China, in June 1936, Chaplin privately told relatives that they were married only in common law. The two nonetheless maintained a friendly relationship, and Goddard remained close with Chaplin's elder two sons Charles Chaplin Jr. and Sydney Chaplin. 

In May 1944, Goddard married Burgess Meredith at David O. Selznick's home in Beverly Hills. In October 1944, she suffered the miscarriage of a son; it was the only pregnancy of hers reported, and she had no children from any of her marriages. In the latter part of their marriage, Meredith was placed on the Hollywood blacklist. On the way to a premiere, the two were mobbed by a baying crowd screaming "Communists!"; Goddard was reported to have said "Shall I roll down the window and hit them with my diamonds, Bugsy?" They divorced in June 1949.

In 1958, Goddard married writer Erich Maria Remarque. They remained married until Remarque's death in 1970.

Death and legacy

On April 23, 1990, aged 79, Goddard died at her home in Switzerland from heart failure. She is buried in Ronco Village Cemetery, next to Remarque and her mother.

Arguably, Goddard's foremost legacies remain her two feature films with Charles Chaplin — Modern Times and The Great Dictator — and a US$20 million donation to New York University (NYU) in New York City to fund an institution devoted to European studies, named after Remarque. This contribution was also in recognition of her friendship with the Indiana-born politician and former NYU President John Brademas. Goddard Hall, a residence hall for NYU freshmen in Greenwich Village, is named in her honor.

Fictional portrayals
Goddard was portrayed by Gwen Humble in the made-for-TV movie Moviola: The Scarlett O'Hara War (1980), by Diane Lane in the 1992 film Chaplin, and by Natalie Wilder in the 2011 play Puma, written by Julie Gilbert, who also wrote Opposite Attraction: The Lives of Erich Maria Remarque and Paulette Goddard''.

Filmography

Notes

References

Sources

External links

 
 
 
 
 Photographs and literature
 Paulette Goddard portrait gallery NY Public Library (Billy Rose collection)
 Paulette Goddard's site (English)
 Photos of Paulette Goddard in 'Pot O Gold' by Ned Scott

1910 births
1990 deaths
20th-century American actresses
American expatriates in Switzerland
American film actresses
Film producers from Missouri
Female models from New York (state)
American people of Russian-Jewish descent
American people of English descent
American stage actresses
American television actresses
Chaplin family
Vaudeville performers
Deaths from emphysema
Paramount Pictures contract players
Actresses from Kansas City, Missouri
Actresses from New York City
Ziegfeld girls
20th-century American businesspeople
20th-century American businesswomen
Metro-Goldwyn-Mayer contract players
American women film producers
Film producers from New York (state)
Goldwyn Girls